Protenodontosaurus is an extinct genus of placodont from Italy.

References

Placodonts
Prehistoric reptile genera